Oswayo Creek is a stream in the U.S. states of New York and Pennsylvania. It is a tributary to the Allegheny River.

Oswayo is a Native American name purported to mean "the place of flies". Variant names and spellings include "Oswaya Creek", "Oswaye Creek", "Oswego Creek", and "Osweya Creek".

References

Rivers of New York (state)
Rivers of Allegany County, New York
Rivers of Cattaraugus County, New York
Rivers of Pennsylvania
Rivers of McKean County, Pennsylvania
Rivers of Potter County, Pennsylvania
Tributaries of the Allegheny River